A golf course is the grounds where the game of golf is played.

Golf Course may also refer to:
 Golf Course metro station, of the Delhi Metro